Gigantoporidae is a family of bryozoans belonging to the order Cheilostomatida.

Genera:
 Barbadiopsis Winston & Woollacott, 2009
 Cosciniopsis Canu & Bassler, 1927
 Gephyrophora Busk, 1884
 Gigantopora Ridley, 1881
 Hemicosciniopsis Vigneaux, 1949
 Stenopsella Bassler, 1952

References

Cheilostomatida